Callicarpa (beautyberry) is a genus of shrubs and small trees in the family Lamiaceae. They are native to east and southeast Asia (where the majority of the species occur), Australia, Madagascar, southeast North America and South America.

Growth

The temperate species are deciduous, the tropical species evergreen. The leaves are simple, opposite, and 5–25 cm long. The flowers are in clusters, white to pinkish. The fruit is a berry, 2–5 mm diameter and pink to red-purple with a highly distinctive metallic lustre, are very conspicuous in clusters on the bare branches after the leaves fall. The berries last well into the winter or dry season and are an important survival food for birds and other animals, though they will not eat them until other sources are depleted. The berries are highly astringent but are made into wine and jelly. Callicarpa species are used as food plants by the larvae of some Lepidoptera species in Asia including Endoclita malabaricus and Endoclita undulifer.

Familiar species

American beautyberry Callicarpa americana is native to the southeastern United States. It can typically reach 1 to 2 meters in height. A jelly can be made from its ripe berries.

Ornamental varieties of Callicarpa americana have been bred to have pink or white berries.

Bodinier's beautyberry Callicarpa bodinieri, native to west-central China (Sichuan, Hubei, Shaanxi), is more cold-tolerant than C. americana, and is the species most widely cultivated in northwestern Europe. It can reach 3 meters tall.
Japanese beautyberry Callicarpa japonica, native to Japan, is also cultivated in gardens. It is called Murasakishikibu in Japanese, in honor of Murasaki Shikibu.
Purple beautyberry Callicarpa dichotoma, native to Japan, China, and Korea.

Uses

Insect repellent
American beautyberry has been used as a folk remedy to prevent mosquito bites.  Four chemicals isolated from Callicarpa have been shown to act as insect repellents: borneol, callicarpenal, intermedeol, and spathulenol.   The use of callicarpenal has been patented by the United States Department of Agriculture's Agriculture Research Service as a mosquito repellent.

Anticancer activity
The beautyberry leaves have been shown to possess anticancer activity against human lung adenocarcinoma cell line, A549 via alteration of the redox homeostasis.

Species
Accepted species

Callicarpa aculeolata Schauer - Dominican Republic
Callicarpa acuminata Kunth - Latin America from Mexico to Bolivia
Callicarpa acutidens Schauer - Vietnam
Callicarpa acutifolia C.H.Chang - Guangxi, Guangdong
Callicarpa albidotomentella Merr. - Luzon 
Callicarpa alongensis Dop - Vietnam
Callicarpa americana L. - southeastern United States from Texas to Maryland; Cuba, Bermuda, Bahamas
Callicarpa ampla Schauer  - Puerto Rico
Callicarpa angusta Schauer  - Philippines
Callicarpa angustifolia King & Gamble - Indochina, southern China
Callicarpa anisodonta Bramley - Sulawesi
Callicarpa anisophylla C.Y.Wu ex W.Z.Fang - Guangxi, Guangdong
Callicarpa anomala (Ridl.) B.L.Burtt - Sarawak
Callicarpa apoensis Elmer - Mindanao
Callicarpa arborea Roxb. - southern China, Tibet, Indian Subcontinent, Southeast Asia, Andaman Islands, New Guinea
Callicarpa areolata Urb. - Cuba
Callicarpa argentii Bramley - Kalimantan
Callicarpa badipilosa S.Atkins - Brunei
Callicarpa barbata Ridl. - Borneo
Callicarpa basilanensis Merr. - Basilan, Mindanao
Callicarpa basitruncata Merr. ex Moldenke - Hainan
Callicarpa baviensis Moldenke - Vietnam
Callicarpa bicolor Juss - Philippines, Sulawesi, Bismarck Archipelago, Palau
Callicarpa bodinieri H.Lév - Indochina, southern China
Callicarpa bodinieroides R.H.Miao - Guizhou
Callicarpa borneensis Moldenke - Borneo
Callicarpa bracteata Dop - Vietnam
Callicarpa brevipes (Benth.) Hance - Vietnam, Cambodia, southern China
Callicarpa brevipetiolata Merr. - Sumatra
Callicarpa brevistyla Munir - Northern Territory of Australia
Callicarpa bucheri Moldenke - Cuba
Callicarpa candicans (Burm.f.) Hochr. - China, Bangladesh, Southeast Asia, New Guinea, northern Australia, Micronesia
Callicarpa cathayana C.H.Chang - southern China
Callicarpa caudata Maxim. - Maluku, Philippines, Sulawesi, New Guinea, Solomon Islands, Queensland 
Callicarpa cinnamomea (Hallier f.) Govaerts - Sulawesi
Callicarpa collina Diels - Guangdong, Jiangxi
Callicarpa coriacea Bramley - Sabah
Callicarpa crassinervis Urb. - Cuba
Callicarpa cubensis Urb. - Cuba
Callicarpa cuneifolia Britton & P.Wilson - Cuba
Callicarpa denticulata Merr. - Batan in Phlippines
Callicarpa dentosa (H.T.Chang) W.Z.Fang - Guangdong
Callicarpa dichotoma (Lour.) K.Koch - China, Japan, Korea, Ryukyu Islands, Vietnam
Callicarpa dolichophylla Merr. - southern China, Taiwan, Vietnam, Luzon
Callicarpa endertii (Moldenke) Bramley - Kalimantan
Callicarpa erioclona Schauer - Vietnam, Borneo, Sulawesi, Java, Philippines, New Guinea, Bismarck Archipelago
Callicarpa erythrosticta Merr. & Chun - Hainan
Callicarpa fasciculiflora Merr. - Bucas Grande in Philippines
Callicarpa ferruginea Sw. - Cuba, Jamaica
Callicarpa flavida Elmer - Mindanao, Dinagat
Callicarpa floccosa Urb. - Cuba
Callicarpa fulva A.Rich. - Cuba
Callicarpa fulvohirsuta Merr. - Sabah
Callicarpa furfuracea Ridl. - Thailand, Malaysia
Callicarpa gibaroana Baro & P.Herrera - Cuba
Callicarpa giraldii Hesse ex Rehder  - China
Callicarpa glabra Koidz. - Ogasawara-shoto (Bonin Islands)
Callicarpa glabrifolia S.Atkins - Borneo
Callicarpa gracilipes Rehder - Sichuan, Hubei
Callicarpa grandiflora (Hallier f.) Govaerts - Sumatra, Sulawesi
Callicarpa grisebachii Urb. - Cuba
Callicarpa havilandii (King & Gamble) H.J.Lam - Borneo
Callicarpa heterotricha Merr. - Vietnam
Callicarpa hispida (Moldenke) Bramley - Sabah
Callicarpa hitchcockii Millsp. - Bahamas, Cuba
Callicarpa homoeophylla (Hallier f.) Govaerts - Borneo, Sulawesi
Callicarpa hungtaii C.Pei & S.L.Chen - Guangdong
Callicarpa hypoleucophylla T.P.Lin & J.L.Wang - Taiwan
Callicarpa inaequalis Teijsm. & Binn. ex Bakh. - Java
Callicarpa integerrima Champ. ex Benth. - southern China
Callicarpa involucrata Merr. - Borneo
Callicarpa japonica Thunb. - China, Japan, Korea, Ryukyu Islands, Taiwan
Callicarpa kerrii Leerat. & A.J.Paton - Thailand
Callicarpa kinabaluensis Bakh. & Heine - Sabah
Callicarpa kochiana Makino - China, Japan, Vietnam, Taiwan
Callicarpa kwangtungensis Chun - southern China
Callicarpa laciniata H.J.Lam - Timor
Callicarpa lamii Hosok - Mariana Islands
Callicarpa lancifolia Millsp. - Cuba
Callicarpa leonis Moldenke - Cuba
Callicarpa lingii Merr. - Anhui, Jiangxi, Zhejiang
Callicarpa loboapiculata Metcalf - Guangdong, Guangxi, Guizhou, Hainan, Hunan.
Callicarpa longibracteata C.H.Chang - Hong Kong
Callicarpa longifolia Lam. - China, Southeast Asia, New Guinea, Bismarck Archipelago, Christmas Island, Queensland
Callicarpa longipes Dunn - Anhui, Fujian, Guangdong, Jiangxi
Callicarpa longipetiolata Merr. - Luzon
Callicarpa luteopunctata C.H.Chang - Sichuan, Yunnan
Callicarpa macrophylla Vahl. - China, Himalayas, Indian Subcontinent, Southeast Asia, New Guinea, Queensland
Callicarpa madagascariensis Moldenke - Madagascar
Callicarpa magnifolia Merr. - Luzon
Callicarpa maingayi King & Gamble - Thailand to Malaya
Callicarpa membranacea C.H.Chang - China
Callicarpa mendumiae Bramley - Sulawesi
Callicarpa micrantha S.Vidal - Philippines, Micronesia
Callicarpa moana Borhidi & O.Muñiz - Cuba
Callicarpa moldenkeana A.Rajendran & P.Daniel - Meghalaya
Callicarpa mollis Siebold & Zucc. - Japan, Korea
Callicarpa nipensis Britton & P.Wilson - Cuba
Callicarpa nishimurae Koidz. - Ogasawara-shoto (Bonin Islands)
Callicarpa nudiflora Hook. & Arn. - China, Himalayas, Indian Subcontinent, Indochina
Callicarpa oblanceolata Urb. - Cuba
Callicarpa oligantha Merr. - Guangdong
Callicarpa oshimensis Hayata - Ryukyu Islands
Callicarpa pachyclada Quisumb. & Merr. - Luzon, Samar
Callicarpa paloensis Elmer - Luzon, Leyte
Callicarpa parvifolia Hook. & Arn. - Nayarit
Callicarpa pauciflora Chun ex H.T.Chang - Guangdong, Jiangxi
Callicarpa pedunculata R.Br. - China, Himalayas, Southeast Asia, New Guinea, Melanesia, Australia
Callicarpa peichieniana H.Ma & W.B.Yu - Guangdong, Guangxi, Hunan
Callicarpa pentandra Roxb. - Thailand, Malaysia, Indonesia, Philippines, New Guinea, Solomon Islands
Callicarpa petelotii Dop - Vietnam
Callicarpa phuluangensis Leerat. & A.J.Paton - Thailand
Callicarpa pilosissima Maxim. - Taiwan
Callicarpa pingshanensis C.Y.Wu ex W.Z.Fang - Sichuan
Callicarpa platyphylla Merr. - Luzon, Polillo
Callicarpa plumosa Quisumb. & Merr. - Luzon
Callicarpa prolifera C.Y.Wu - Yunnan, Guangxi
Callicarpa pseudorubella C.H.Chang - Guangdong
Callicarpa pseudoverticillata Bramley - Sulawesi
Callicarpa psilocalyx C.B.Clarke - Meghalaya, Myanmar, Thailand, Cambodia
Callicarpa pullei (H.J.Lam) Govaerts - New Guinea
Callicarpa quaternifolia (Hallier f.) Govaerts - Borneo, Sulawesi
Callicarpa ramiflora Merr. - Philippines
Callicarpa randaiensis Hayata - Taiwan
Callicarpa remotiflora T.P.Lin & J.L.Wang - Hengchun Peninsula in Taiwan
Callicarpa remotiserrulata Hayata - Hengchun Peninsula in Taiwan
Callicarpa resinosa C.Wright & Moldenke - Cuba
Callicarpa reticulata Sw. - Jamaica
Callicarpa revoluta Moldenke - Cuba
Callicarpa ridleyi S.Moore - Java
Callicarpa roigii Britton - Cuba
Callicarpa rubella Lindl. - China, Himalayas, Southeast Asia
Callicarpa rudis S.Moore - Sumatra
Callicarpa ruptofoliata R.H.Miao - Guangdong
Callicarpa saccata Steenis - Borneo
Callicarpa salicifolia C.Pei & W.Z.Fang - southern China
Callicarpa scandens (Moldenke) Govaerts - Sabah
Callicarpa selleana Urb. & Ekman - Massif de la Selle in Haiti
Callicarpa shaferi Britton & P.Wilson - Cuba
Callicarpa shikokiana Makino - Japan
Callicarpa × shirasawana Makino  - Japan  (C. japonica × C. mollis)
Callicarpa simondii Dop - Vietnam
Callicarpa siongsaiensis Metcalf - Fujian
Callicarpa sordida Urb. - Dominican Republic
Callicarpa stapfii Moldenke - Sabah
Callicarpa subaequalis Bramley - Kalimantan
Callicarpa subalbida Elmer - Luzon, Mindoro
Callicarpa subglandulosa Elmer - Luzon, Negros
Callicarpa subintegra  Merr. - Luzon
Callicarpa subpubescens Hook. & Arn. - Bonin Islands, Volcano Islands
Callicarpa superposita Merr. - Borneo
Callicarpa surigaensis Merr. - Samar, Mindanao
Callicarpa takakumensis Hatus - Mt. Takakuma in Japan
Callicarpa teneriflora Bramley - Kalimantan
Callicarpa thozetii Munir - Queensland
Callicarpa tikusikensis Masam. - Taiwan
Callicarpa tingwuensis C.H.Chang - Guangdong
Callicarpa toaensis Borhidi & O.Muñiz - Cuba
Callicarpa tomentosa (L.) L. - Indian Subcontinent, Myanmar, Thailand, Malaya
Callicarpa × tosaensis Makino - Japan   (C. japonica × C. kochiana)
Callicarpa vansteenisii Moldenke - Sumatra
Callicarpa vestita Wall. ex C.B.Clarke - eastern Himalayas, Nepal, Bangladesh, Bhutan, Assam
Callicarpa woodii Merr. - Borneo
Callicarpa wrightii Britton & P.Wilson - Cuba
Callicarpa yunnanensis W.Z.Fang - Yunnan, Vietnam

References

External links

 Dr. Duke's Databases: Callicarpa americana - List of Chemicals
 Callicarpa info 
 Eat The Weeds - Beautyberry

 
Lamiaceae genera
Medicinal plants
Taxa named by Carl Linnaeus